Jean-Paul Cara (born 9 September 1948, Montpellier) is a French singer and composer.  He has authored several songs that have won prizes at the Eurovision contest, most notably the single L'Oiseau et l'Enfant in collaboration with Joe Gracy and performed by Marie Myriam (1st place for France, 1977 Eurovision Song Contest).

France has not won a Eurovision since. Cara wrote the song "Un, deux, trois", performed by Catherine Ferry, that came in 2nd place (for France) at Eurovision 1976.  He collaborated with Pierre Delanoë on the French lyrics for the song Ein bißchen Frieden, composed by Ralph Siegel, that won 1st place for Germany at Eurovision 1982. His on stage performance at the 1980 Eurovision taking part in Sophie et Magaly's entry of "Papa Pingouin" granted them 9th place with 56 points. 

In January 2010 Jean-Paul Cara was named an Officier in the Ordre des Arts et des Lettres. He lives in Nébian, France and continues to perform.

References

External links
 

French songwriters
Male songwriters
Living people
Eurovision Song Contest winners
Officiers of the Ordre des Arts et des Lettres
France in the Eurovision Song Contest
1948 births